Arthur Mostyn Evans (13 July 1925 – 12 January 2002) was the general secretary of the Transport and General Workers Union (TGWU), then the largest general trade union in the United Kingdom, from 1978 until 1985.

Biography
Moss Evans was born in a small terraced house in the Welsh village of Cefn Coed near Merthyr Tydfil. When he was 12, his family moved to Small Heath, Birmingham, as his father had heard there was work which he was determined to find. This was towards the end of The Depression and his father, a coal miner, had been out of work for 14 years.

Evans first became involved with trade unions whilst working for the Joseph Lucas combine, where he joined the Amalgamated Engineering Union in 1940 at the age of 15. His long involvement with the Transport and General Workers Union (TGWU) started ten years later when he changed jobs, and moved to the Bakelite factory in Birmingham, where he became shop steward a year later. His rise through the organisation of the TGWU started in 1956 when he became engineering and chemical officer for the Birmingham East district. 

This was followed by;
 Birmingham regional trade group secretary 1960–1966
 London Engineering National Officer 1966–1969
 National Secretary (Automotive Section) 1969–1973
 National Organiser 1973–1978
 General Secretary 1978–1985

also
 Member, Trades Union Congress General Council 1977–1985
 Councillor (Labour Party), Borough of King's Lynn and West Norfolk 1991–2001
 King's Lynn town Mayor 1996–1997

Personal life
He married Laura Bigglestone in 1947; they had three sons and three daughters together. He died in Norfolk on 12 January 2002.

References

1925 births
2002 deaths
General secretaries of the Transport and General Workers' Union
Members of the General Council of the Trades Union Congress